In biology, the BBCH-scale for olive describes the phenological development of olive trees using the BBCH-scale.

The phenological growth stages and BBCH-identification keys of olive trees are:

References

BBCH-scale